Aghabullogue Bridge is a bridge in County Cork, Ireland, situated  north-east of Aghabullogue village, and  north-west of Coachford village. A footstick over the Delehinagh River is depicted on the 1841 surveyed OS map, where the bridge now stands. It would appear to have been constructed by the beginning of the twentieth century, and is depicted on the 1901 surveyed OS map, but not named. The bridge is located at the meeting point of the townlands of Clonmoyle West and Dromatimore, within both the civil parish and catholic parish of Aghabullogue.

Many surviving bridges in mid-Cork are originally constructed of stone, arched in shape, and late eighteenth or early nineteenth century in date, and often contain semi-circular arches and pointed breakwaters. Aghabullogue Bridge, however, would appear to be of a later construction date.

See also
Clonmoyle Racecourse
Ballinadihy Bridge

References

External links
 1841 surveyed OS map (maps.osi.ie)
 1901 surveyed OS map (maps.osi.ie)
 acrheritage.info

Bridges in County Cork